Craig Edwards (born 8 July 1982) is an English former footballer, who played as a midfielder.

Career
Edwards made his debut for Southend United in the Football League Trophy on 5 December 2000 at home to Cheltenham Town in the 2–0 victory. He made his debut in the Football League replacing David Lee as a substitute, in a 3–1 win over Mansfield Town in a Division Three match on 5 May 2001.

References

External links

Living people
1982 births
Footballers from Greater London
English footballers
Association football midfielders
Tottenham Hotspur F.C. players
Southend United F.C. players
Grays Athletic F.C. players
Redbridge F.C. players
Chelmsford City F.C. players
Bishop's Stortford F.C. players
Billericay Town F.C. players
English Football League players
Isthmian League players
National League (English football) players